Vila Thomaz Albornoz is a village in the border region between Brazil and Uruguay claimed by both countries. It is located adjacent to Villa Masoller in Uruguay and on international maps it appears as a territory under discussion. The contested region is located in what was called Rincão de Artigas, which has 22,000 hectares and has been litigated since 1934. Vila Albornoz was installed in 1985, on land ceded by rancher Thomaz Albornoz, to mark the Brazilian presence in the area.

References

Gaúchos habitam território de disputa entre Brasil e Uruguai. Jornal Zero Hora, Porto Alegre, 2012.
Revista Piauí. Agosto 2013. Edição 83 
Limite contestado, pero no mucho

External links
Reportagem sobre a vila

Geography of Brazil
Territorial disputes of Brazil